= Melinda Crane =

American-German journalist and political commentator

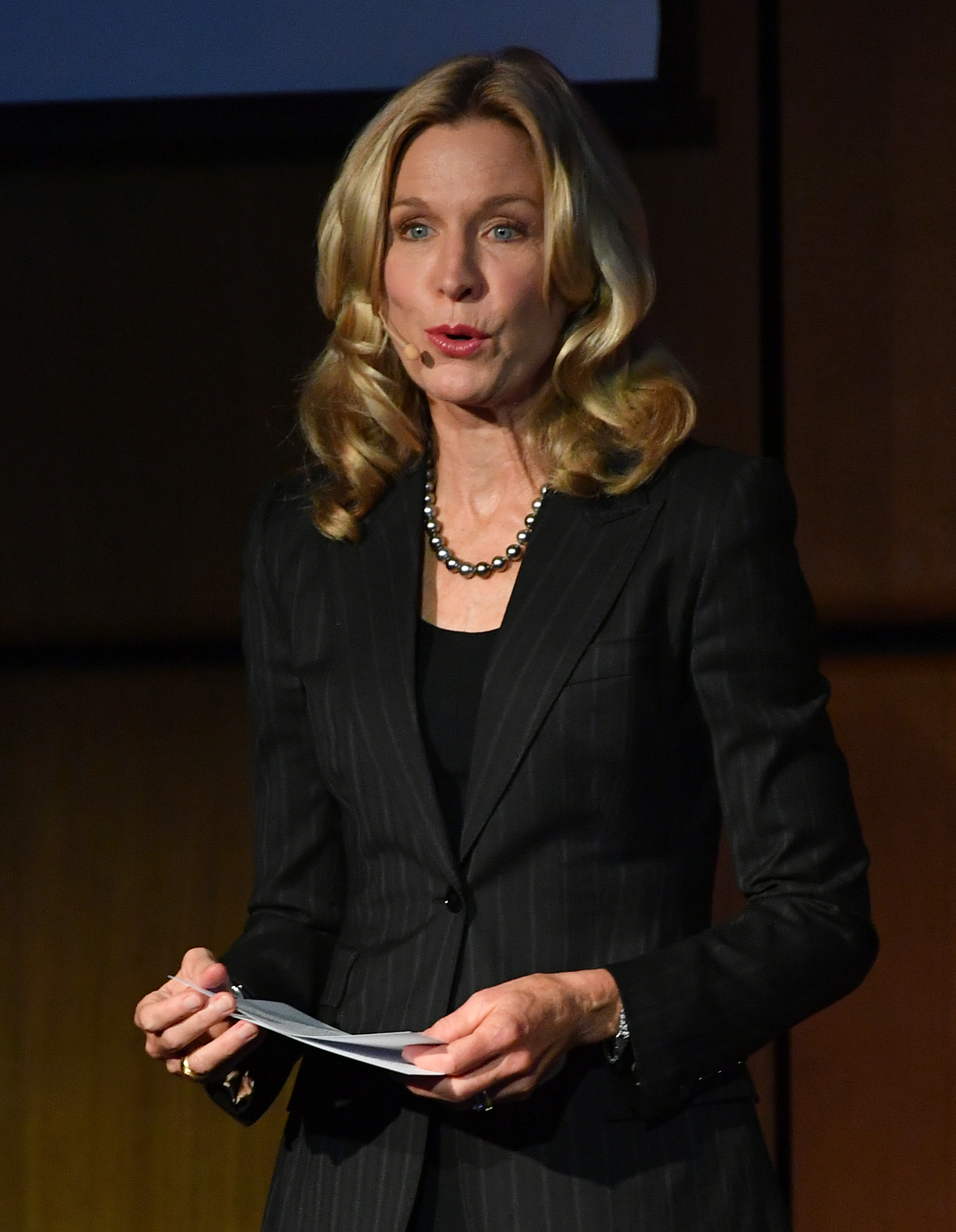
- Crane at the 2019 IAEA Scientific Forum
- Born: November 18, 1956 (age 69); Boston, Massachusetts, U.S.
- Education: Brown University; Harvard Law School; Fletcher School of Law and Diplomacy of Tufts University
- Occupations: journalist, political commentator, publicist and television host
- Children: 2

Melinda Crane-Röhrs (born November 18, 1956) is an American journalist, political commentator, publicist and television host. She has lived in Germany since 1985. She is the Chief Political Correspondent at Deutsche Welle.
